This is a list of all people prominent enough to be contained in Wikipedia who were associated with the U.S. state of Delaware, including those who were born, lived or were otherwise associated with locally performed activities in a recognizable way.

A

Wilbur L. Adams (1884–1937) – U.S. Representative from Delaware
J. Edward Addicks (1841–1919) – gas tycoon; his attempts to buy a U.S. Senate seat bolstered support for the Seventeenth Amendment to the U.S. Constitution; lived in Claymont
J. Frank Allee (1857–1938) – jeweler; Senator from Delaware
Richard Allen (1760–1831) – founder, African Methodist Episcopal Church
William F. Allen (1883–1946) – U.S. Representative from Delaware
Ann Althouse (born 1951) – law professor, legal blogger; born in Wilmington
Thomas L. Ambro (born 1949) – Judge on the U.S. Court of Appeals; worked in Wilmington
John Andrews (1746–1813) – minister; academic
Anthony J. Arduengo, III (born 1952) – chemist; material scientist; discoverer of stable carbenes
Adrienne Arsht (born 1942) – lawyer; philanthropist; born in Wilmington

B
Ba–Bm

John Backus (1924–2007) – computer scientist; invented Fortran and Backus–Naur form; raised in Wilmington
Walter W. Bacon (1879–1962) – Mayor of Wilmington; Governor of Delaware
L. Heisler Ball (1861–1932) – U.S. Representative and U.S. Senator from Delaware
Samuel Bancroft (1840–1915) – industrialist; art philanthropist; born in Wilmington
William Poole Bancroft (1835–1928) – industrialist; land conservationist
Phineas Banning (1830–1885) – businessman and entrepreneur in Delaware and California
Richard Bassett (1745–1815) – U.S. Senator from Delaware; Governor of Delaware
Alice M. Batchelder (born 1944) – attorney; judge of the U.S. Court of Appeals for the Sixth Circuit
Martin W. Bates (1786–1869) – State Representative; U.S. Senator from Delaware
Alexis I. du Pont Bayard (1918–1985) – veteran, World War II; Lieutenant Governor of Delaware
James A. Bayard Sr. (1767–1815) – U.S. Representative; U.S. Senator from Delaware
James A. Bayard Jr. (1799–1880) – lawyer; U.S. Senator from Delaware
Richard H. Bayard (1796–1868) – Chief Justice, Delaware Supreme Court; U.S. Senator from Delaware
Thomas F. Bayard (1828–1898) – U.S. Senator from Delaware; U.S. Secretary of State
Thomas F. Bayard Jr. (1868–1942) – U.S. Senator from Delaware
Paul Lorin Bechly (born 1958) – chemical engineer
Gunning Bedford Sr. (1742–1797) – Revolutionary officer; Governor of Delaware
Gunning Bedford Jr. (1747–1812) – lawyer; Continental Congressman from Delaware
Caleb P. Bennett (1758–1836) – Revolutionary officer; Governor of Delaware
Valerie Bertinelli (born 1960) – actress (One Day at a Time, Hot in Cleveland); born in Wilmington
Huck Betts (1897–1987) – Major League Baseball player, born in Millsboro
Mahlon Betts (1795–1867) – banker; transportation businessman
Stephen Biddle (born 1959) – author; historian; policy analyst; columnist
Beau Biden (1969–2015) – lawyer; Attorney General of Delaware; son of Joe Biden
Jill Biden (born 1951) – college professor; current First Lady of the United States
Joe Biden (born 1942) – current President of the United States; former Vice President of the United States (2009–2017); longtime Senator from Delaware (1973–2009); (born in Scranton, PA) 
Benjamin T. Biggs (1821–1893) – U.S. Representative; Governor of Delaware
John Biggs Jr. (1895–1979) – former Chief Judge of the 3rd Circuit U.S. Court of Appeals
Clyde Bishop – U.S. Ambassador to the Marshall Islands
Emily Bissell (1861–1948) – anti-suffragist; introduced Christmas seals to the U.S.

Bn–Bz

J. Caleb Boggs (1909–1993) – Governor of Delaware; U.S. Senator from Delaware
Cedella Booker (1926–2008) – singer; Jamaica native, lived in Delaware; mother of singer Bob Marley
Nicole Bosso (born 1986) – Miss Delaware USA 2007
William H. Boyce (1855–1942) – Justice of the Superior Court; U.S. Representative from Delaware
John Walter Bratton (1867–1947) – Tin Pan Alley composer
Madison Brengle (born 1990) – tennis player; 2007 Juniors Wimbledon runner-up
Jay Briscoe (born 1984) – professional wrestler; ROH World Champion and eight-time ROH World Tag Team Champion with his brother Mark Briscoe
Mark Briscoe (born 1985) – professional wrestler; eight-time ROH World Tag Team Champion with brother Jay
Dennis Brockenborough – trombone player
Franklin Brockson (1865–1942) – State Representative and U.S. Representative from Delaware
James M. Broom (1776–1850) – lawyer and U.S. Representative from Delaware
Hugh T. Broomall (born 1948) – Major General, Delaware Air National Guard
Clifford Brown (1930–1956) – jazz trumpeter, born in Wilmington
C. Douglass Buck (1890–1965) – Governor of Delaware; U.S. Senator from Delaware
David P. Buckson (1920-2017) – Attorney General of Delaware; Governor of Delaware
Edward G. Budd (1870–1946) – automotive inventor; founder, Budd Company
Colin Burns (born 1982) – professional soccer player in Norway
Hiram R. Burton (1841–1927) – physician and U.S. Representative from Delaware
William Burton (1789–1866) – physician and Governor of Delaware
Randy Bush (born 1958) – MLB pitcher and executive; born in Dover
William Sharp Bush (1786–1812) – U.S. Marine-award winner, War of 1812; born in Wilmington

C
Ca–Cm

Henry Seidel Canby (1878–1961) – educator; editor, The Saturday Review of Literature
Annie Jump Cannon (1863–1941) – pioneering female astronomer
Philip L. Cannon (1850–1929) – Lieutenant Governor of Delaware
William Cannon (1809–1865) – General Assemblyman; Governor of Delaware
Joseph M. Carey (1845–1924) – Wyoming politician; born in Delaware
Louis Carlet (born 1966) – union activist
John Carney (born 1956) – U.S. Representative for Delaware, current Governor
Wallace Carothers (1896–1937) – chemist; inventor of neoprene and nylon
Charles I. Carpenter (1906–1994) – Major General; first Chief of Chaplains of the U.S. Air Force
R. R. M. Carpenter (1877–1949) – businessman; DuPont executive; owner, Philadelphia Phillies
R. R. M. Carpenter Jr. (1915–1990) – owner, Philadelphia Phillies
Ruly Carpenter (1940–2021) – former owner, Philadelphia Phillies
Walter S. Carpenter Jr. (1888–1976) – businessman; oversaw construction of Manhattan Project facilities
Thomas R. Carper (born 1947) – Governor of Delaware; U.S. Senator from Delaware
Vincenza Carrieri-Russo – Miss Delaware USA 2008; second runner up, Miss United States 2014
Elbert N. Carvel (1910–2005) – businessman; Governor of Delaware
Michael N. Castle (born 1939) – U.S. Representative; Governor of Delaware
John W. Causey (1841–1908) – farmer; U.S. Representative from Delaware
Peter F. Causey (1801–1871) – General Assemblyman; Governor of Delaware
John T. Chain Jr. (born 1934) – U.S. Air Force General; commander, Strategic Air Command
Alfred D. Chandler Jr. (1918–2007) – business history professor, Harvard University; born in Guyencourt
Thomas H. Chilton (1899–1972) – pioneer, modern chemical engineering; member, Manhattan Project
Uma Chowdhry (born 1947) – scientist
Anne Rogers Clark (1929–2006) – dog breeder and trainer
John Clark (1761–1821) – General Assemblyman; Governor of Delaware
John M. Clayton (1796–1856) – U.S. Senator from Delaware; U.S. Secretary of State
Joshua Clayton (1744–1798) – Governor of Delaware; U.S. Senator from Delaware
Thomas Clayton (1777–1854) – Chief Justice; U.S. Senator from Delaware

Cn–Cz

John P. Cochran (1809–1898) – farmer; Governor of Delaware
Ashley Coleman (born 1981) – Miss Teen USA 1999
Isaac Collins (1746–1817) – early American printer; freedom-of-the-press activist
John Collins (1776–1822) – manufacturer; Governor of Delaware
Thomas Collins (1732–1789) – General Assemblymann; President of Delaware
Cornelius P. Comegys (1780–1851) – General Assemblyman; Governor of Delaware
Joseph P. Comegys (1813–1893) – U.S. Senator from Delaware; Chief Justice of Delaware
John Cook (1730–1789) – General Assemblyman; Governor of Delaware
Charles "Tarzan" Cooper (1907–1980) – Philadelphia professional basketball player
Thomas Cooper (1764–1829) – General Assemblyman; U.S. Representative from Delaware
William B. Cooper (1777–1849) – General Assembly and U.S. Representative from Delaware
Lammot du Pont Copeland (1905–1983) – president, DuPont (1962–1967); co-founder, Population Action International
Louise E. du Pont Crowninshield (1877–1958) – philanthropist; preservationist; founding trustee, National Trust for Historic Preservation
Robert Crumb (born 1943) – artist; illustrator; lived in Milford and Dover
Elisha D. Cullen (1799–1862) – lawyer; U. S. Representative from Delaware
Nancy Currie (born 1958) – astronaut, born in Wilmington

D

Carl C. Danberg (born 1964) – lawyer; Attorney General of Delaware
F. O. C. Darley (1822–1888) – painter; illustrator
Samuel Davies (1723–1761) – writer, preacher, 4th President of Princeton University
Jehu Davis (1738–1802) – General Assemblyman; President of Delaware
Elena Delle Donne (born 1989) – Women's National Basketball Association player
Matthew P. Denn (born 1966) – Insurance Commissioner; Lieutenant Governor of Delaware
William D. Denney (1873–1953) – General Assemblyman; Governor of Delaware
Delino DeShields (born 1969) – Major League Baseball player; born in Delaware
John Dickinson (1732–1808) – President of Delaware; President of Pennsylvania
Mary Norris Dickinson (1740–1803) – owner of one of the largest libraries in colonial America
Philemon Dickinson (1739–1809) – Continental Congressman from Delaware; U.S. Senator from New Jersey
Donte DiVincenzo (born 1997) - National Basketball Association Shooting Guard for the Milwaukee Bucks
John Dossett – actor; singer
Dave Douglas (1918–1978) – professional golfer (1940s and 1950s)
A. Felix du Pont Jr. (1905–1996) – aviator; co-founder, predecessor of US Airways
Alfred I. du Pont (1864–1935) – businessman; philanthropist; established the Nemours Foundation
Alfred V. du Pont (1798–1856) – head of the DuPont Company (1837–1850)
Charles I. du Pont (1797–1869) – manufacturer; Delaware General Assemblyman
E. Paul du Pont (1887–1950) – founder, Du Pont Motors; president, Indian Motocycle Manufacturing Company
Éleuthère Irénée du Pont (1771–1834) – founder, DuPont Company
Eugene du Pont (1840–1902) – head of the DuPont Company (1889–1902)
Henry du Pont (1812–1889) – head of the DuPont Company; Major General, American Civil War
Henry A. du Pont (1838–1926) – veteran, American Civil War; U.S. Senator from Delaware
Henry Francis du Pont (1880–1969) – art collector; established the Winterthur Museum, Garden and Library
Irénée du Pont (1876–1963) – president, DuPont Company (1919–1926)
Lammot du Pont I (1831–1884) – scientist; inventor; soldier, American Civil War
Lammot du Pont II (1880–1952) – president, DuPont Company (1926–1940)
Pierre S. du Pont (1870–1954) – inventor; president, DuPont Company and General Motors
Pierre S. du Pont IV (1935–2021) – U. S. Representative; Governor of Delaware
Pierre Samuel du Pont de Nemours (1739–1817) – helped negotiate the 1783 Treaty of Paris and the Louisiana Purchase
Richard C. du Pont (1911–1943) – aviator, co-founder, All American Aviation, the forerunner of US Airways
Samuel Francis Du Pont (1803–1865) – Rear Admiral, United States Navy
T. Coleman du Pont (1863–1930) – president, DuPont Company; U. S. Senator from Delaware
Victor Marie du Pont (1767–1827) – manufacturer; Delaware General Assemblyman
Sara Dylan (born 1939) – first wife of Bob Dylan; born in Delaware

E

 Mark Eaton (born 1977) – professional ice hockey player; born in Delaware
 Richard H. Ellis (1919–1989) – General; commander in chief, Strategic Air Command; from Delaware
 Raúl Esparza (born 1970) – actor, born in Delaware
 Oliver Evans (1755–1819) – inventor, born in Delaware
 Thomas B. Evans Jr. (born 1931) – lawyer; U. S. Representative from Delaware

F

 George P. Fisher (1817–1899) – U. S. Representative from Delaware; Justice of District Court
 William H. Forwood (1838–1915) – 19th Surgeon General of the United States Army
 Wayne Franklin (born 1974) – professional baseball player; born in Wilmington
 J. Allen Frear Jr. (1903–1993) – veteran, World War II; U.S. Senator from Delaware
 Louis Freeh (born 1950) – fifth director, Federal Bureau of Investigation; lives in Wilmington
 Yvette Freeman (born 1957) – actress; born in Wilmington

G

Chris Gutierrez (born 1992) – actor
John Gallagher Jr. (born 1984) – actor; musician
Thomas Garrett (1789–1871) – abolitionist; leader in the Underground Railroad
Zack Gelof (born 1999) - baseball player
Michael Gibson (1944–2005) – Broadway trombonist and musical arranger; born in Wilmington
Commodore John P. Gillis (1803–1873) – officer, United States Navy, born in Wilmington
Paul Goldschmidt (born 1987) – first baseman for St. Louis Cardinals, born in Wilmington
Bill Gore (1912–1986) – scientist, founder of W. L. Gore and Associates
Robert W. Gore (1937–2020) – businessman; inventor of Gore-Tex; lived in Newark
Annie Ryder Gracey (1836-1908) – writer, missionary; born in Christiana
Joseph (Joey) Graham (born 1982) – professional basketball player; born in Wilmington
Stephen Graham (born 1982) – professional basketball player; born in Wilmington
George Gray (1840–1925) – Judge of U.S. Court of Appeals; U.S. Senator from Delaware
Dallas Green (1934–2017) – pitcher, manager, and executive in Major League Baseball; born in Newport
Crawford Hallock Greenewalt (1902–1993) – president, DuPont Company and the American Philosophical Society
Crawford Hallock Greenewalt Jr. (1937–2012) – award-winning archaeologist

H

David Hall (1752–1817) – Continental Army officer; Governor of Delaware
John W. Hall (1817–1893) – General Assemblyman; Governor of Delaware
Willard Hall (1780–1875) – U.S. Representative; Justice for the United States District Court
L. Irving Handy (1861–1922) – educator; U.S. Representative from Delaware
Duron Harmon (born 1991) – professional football player; born in Magnolia
Kwame Harris (born 1982) – professional football player; lived and went to high school in Newark
Orien Harris (born 1983) – professional football player; lived and went to high school in Newark
Harry G. Haskell Jr. (1921–2020) – businessman; U.S. Representative from Delaware
John Haslet (c. 1727–1777) – soldier, American Revolutionary War; from Milford
Joseph Haslet (1769–1823) – farmer; Governor of Delaware
Daniel O. Hastings (1874–1966) – lawyer; U.S. Senator from Delaware
David Hazzard (1781–1864) – Associate Justice; Governor of Delaware
Walt Hazzard (1942–2011) – college, Olympic and professional basketball player; college basketball coach; born in Wilmington
William H. Heald (1864–1939) – lawyer; U.S. Representative from Delaware
Henry Heimlich (1920–2016) – physician; inventor, Heimlich Maneuver; born in Wilmington
Anthony Higgins (1840–1912) – lawyer; U.S. Senator from Delaware
John H. Hoffecker (1827–1900) – engineer; U.S. Representative from Delaware
Walter O. Hoffecker (1854–1934) – businessman; U.S. Representative from Delaware
General Thomas Holcomb (1879–1965) – 17th Commandant of the U.S. Marine Corps; born in New Castle
Outerbridge Horsey (1777–1842) – General Assembly; U.S. Senator from Delaware
Cisco Houston (1918–1961) – folk singer; closely associated with Woody Guthrie; born in Wilmington
Henry A. Houston (1847–1925) – businessman; U.S. Representative from Delaware
John W. Houston (1814–1896) – U.S. Representative; Justice, Delaware Superior Court
Robert G. Houston (1867–1946) – lawyer; U.S. Representative from Delaware
Richard Howell (1754–1802) – 3rd Governor of New Jersey; born in Newark
James H. Hughes (1867–1953) – lawyer; U.S. Senator from Delaware
John Hunn (1818–1894) – farmer; abolitionist; from Odessa
John Hunn (1849–1926) – businessman; Governor of Delaware
Morgan Hurd (born 2001) – artistic gymnast; world gold medalist; hometown Middletown
Doug Hutchison (born 1960) – actor; born in Dover

J

 John Johns (1796–1876) – college president; bishop; brother of Kensey Johns Jr.
 Kensey Johns Jr. (1791–1857) – U.S. Representative and Chancellor of Delaware; brother of John Johns
 Eldridge R. Johnson (1867–1945) – co-creator, Victor Talking Machine Company; born in Wilmington
 Judy Johnson (1899–1989) – Negro league baseball player; National Baseball Hall of Famer; lived and died in Wilmington
 Absalom Jones (1746–1818) – abolitionist; minister
 Commodore Jacob Jones (1768–1850) – officer, U.S. Navy; born near Smyrna
 Kent A. Jordan (born 1957) – judge, U.S. Court of Appeals

K

 Dorothy Andrews Elston Kabis (1917–1971) – Treasurer of the United States; lived in Middletown
 Edward E. Kaufman (born 1939) – U.S. Senator from Delaware
 Dyre Kearney (died 1791) – lawyer; delegate, Continental Congress from Delaware
 Pat Kenney (born 1968) – professional wrestler (stage name: Simon Diamond); born in Wilmington
 Richard R. Kenney (1856–1931) – lawyer; U.S. Senator from Delaware
 Patrick Kerr (born 1956) – television actor; born in Wilmington
 Muqtedar Khan (born 1966) – Islamic intellectual; professor, University of Delaware
 Robert Kirkwood (1746–1791) – officer, American Revolutionary War
 Horace G. Knowles (1863–1937) – diplomat (U.S. Ambassador to Bolivia – Bulgaria, the Dominican Republic, Romania, Serbia); served under three different U.S. presidents
 Arturs Krišjānis Kariņš (born 1964) – current Prime Minister of Latvia
 Ellen J. Kullman (born 1956) – president and chief executive officer, DuPont Company
 Stephanie Kwolek (1923–2014) – scientist; inventor, Kevlar

L

 Corinne Landrey (born 1986) – Director of Baseball Operations, the Philadelphia Phillies
 Henry Latimer (1752–1819) – U.S. Representative; U.S. Senator from Delaware
 Caleb R. Layton (1851–1930) – physician; U.S. Representative from Delaware
 Daniel J. Layton (1879–1960) – Chief Justice; Attorney General of Delaware
 Isaac Lea (1792–1886) – conchologist; geologist; businessman; born in Wilmington
 Preston Lea (1841–1916) – businessman; Governor of Delaware
 Judith LeClair (born 1958) – bassoonist, New York Philharmonic; faculty, Juilliard School; from Newark
 Jennifer Leigh (also known as Jennicide) (born 1983) – professional poker player; Playboy model; born in Wilmington
 Warren K. Lewis (1882–1975) – chemical engineer; professor, Massachusetts Institute of Technology
 John Bernard "Hans" Lobert (1881–1968) – Major League Baseball player, coach, manager and scout; born in Wilmington
 Henry Hayes Lockwood (1814–1899) – co-founder, U.S. Naval Academy; Brigadier General, American Civil War
 James R. Lofland (1823–1894) – lawyer; U.S. Representative from Delaware
 Edward L. Loper Sr. (1916–2011) – impressionist and colorist artist; from Wilmington
 Charles B. Lore (1831–1911) – lawyer; U.S. Representative from Delaware

M

John Mabry (born 1970) – professional baseball player; born in Wilmington
Isaac J. MacCollum (1889–1968) – physician; Lieutenant Governor of Delaware
Thomas MacDonough (1783–1825) – commodore, U.S. Navy; victor, Battle of Lake Champlain in the War of 1812
Jack A. Markell (born 1960) – State Treasurer; Governor of Delaware
Edward L. Martin (1837–1897) – lawyer; U.S. Representative from Delaware
Joshua H. Marvil (1825–1895) – merchant; Governor of Delaware
Joseph Maull (1781–1846) – General Assemblyman; Governor of Delaware
Dave May (1943–2012) – professional baseball player; born in New Castle
Sarah McBride (born 1990) – transgender rights activist
Thomas M'Clintock (1792–1876) – abolitionist; women's rights activist
Eleazer McComb (1740–1798) – Continental soldier; Continental Congressman from Delaware
Harris B. McDowell Jr. (1906–1988) – General Assemblyman; U.S. Representative from Delaware
James D. McGinnis (1932–2009) – realtor; Lieutenant Governor of Delaware
Bill McGowan (1896–1954) – Baseball Hall of Fame umpire; born in Wilmington
Bernie McInerney (born 1936) – actor; born in Wilmington
Thomas McKean (1734–1817) – Chief Justice; Governor of Pennsylvania; educated in Delaware
Thomas McKean Thompson McKennan (1794–1852) – 2nd U.S. Secretary of the Interior
John McKinly (1721–1796) – General Assemblyman; President of Delaware
Marshall Kirk McKusick (born 1954) – computer scientist
Louis McLane (1786–1857) – U.S. Representative from Delaware; U.S. Secretary of the Treasury; U.S. Secretary of State; father of Robert Milligan McLane; born in Smyrna
Robert Milligan McLane (1815–1898) – diplomat (U.S. Ambassador to Mexico, France and China; Governor of Maryland); son of Louis McLane; born in Wilmington
Richard C. McMullen (1868–1944) – manufacturer; Governor of Delaware
William Medill (1802–1865) – Governor of Ohio; Commissioner of Indian Affairs; Comptroller of the Treasury (U.S.)
Kevin Mench (born 1978) – professional baseball player, born in Wilmington
Charles R. Miller (1857–1927) – General Assemblyman; Governor of Delaware
Thomas W. Miller (1886–1973) – lawyer; U.S. Representative from Delaware
Henry Milligan (born 1958) – AAU boxing champion (1983)
John J. Milligan (1795–1875) – lawyer; U.S. Representative from Delaware
David L. Mills (born 1938) – computer engineer; Internet pioneer
Ruth Ann Minner (1935-2021) – Lieutenant Governor and Governor of Delaware
Nathaniel Mitchell (1753–1815) – Continental Congressman; Governor of Delaware
Roxanne Modafferi (born 1982) – mixed martial artist, born in Wilmington
Henry Molleston (1762–1819) – General Assemblyman; Governor of Delaware
Hugh Montgomery (died 1780) – sea captain, raised the first American flag in a foreign port
Jacob Moore – Attorney General of Delaware
John Bassett Moore (1860–1947) – member, Permanent Court of Arbitration (also known as the Hague Tribunal); first American judge, International Court of Justice (also known as the World Court)
Vinnie Moore (born 1964) – musician, born in New Castle
Morgan Morgan (1688–1766) – pioneer
Hugh M. Morris – federal judge
John Morris (born 1941) – MLB pitcher, born in Lewes

N

 Daniel Nathans (1928–1999) – microbiologist; recipient, 1978 Nobel Prize in Physiology or Medicine
 Arnold Naudain (1790–1892) – General Assemblyman; U.S. Senator from Delaware
 Garrett Neff (born 1984) – fashion model
 Alice Dunbar Nelson (1875–1935) – poet; journalist; anti-lynching activist
 David M. Nelson (1920–1991) – football coach; College Football Hall of Famer
 John A. Nicholson (1827–1906) – lawyer; U. S. Representative from Delaware

O

Alfie Oakes (born 1968) – farmer and businessman; born in Delaware City
Brett Oberholtzer – baseball pitcher, Houston Astros; born in Christiana
Charles Oberly (born 1946) – attorney; born in Wilmington
John W. O'Daniel – general, U.S. Army; commander, 3rd Infantry Division during World War II
Christine O'Donnell (born 1969) – Republican candidate, U.S. Senate (2006, 2008 and 2010)
Brian O'Neill (born 1995) – NFL offensive lineman; born in Wilmington
Shane O'Neill (born 1972) – tattoo artist, season one winner of Ink Master; born in Middletown
Kirk Olivadotti (born 1974) – NFL coach; born in Wilmington
Ed Oliver (1915–1961) – professional golfer; born in Wilmington
Jeff Otah (born 1986) – former NFL offensive lineman; attended William Penn High School
William Outten (1948–2020) – member of the Delaware House of Representatives; born in Milford
Montell Owens – professional football player; born in Wilmington
Robert "Bob" Older – Small business advocate.  Founder Delaware Small Business Chamber.  Entrepreneur. 
Mehmet Oz – surgeon; television personality; attended Tower Hill School

P

William Jackson Palmer (1836–1909) – general, American Civil War; railroad developer; philanthropist; born in Leipsic
Rudolph Pariser (born 1923) – scientist; formulator, Pariser–Parr–Pople method
George Parshall (1929–2019) – scientist; chemical weapons destruction activist
John Patten (1746–1800) – General Assemblyman; U.S. Representative from Delaware
Samuel Paynter (1768–1845) – General Assemblyman; Governor of Delaware
Charles J. Pedersen (1904–1989) – co-recipient, 1987 Nobel Prize in Chemistry; lived in Delaware (1927–1969)
William Peery (1743–1800) – General Assemblyman; Continental Congressman from Delaware
John B. Penington (1825–1902) – Attorney General of Delaware; U. S. Representative from Delaware
Simeon S. Pennewill (1867–1935) – General Assemblyman; Governor of Delaware
Arthur Perry (born 1946) – basketball player and coach
Russell W. Peterson (1916–2011) – scientist; Governor of Delaware; chairman, White House Council on Environmental Quality; president, National Audubon Society
Daniel Pfeiffer (born 1975) – Senior Advisor to the President under U.S. President Barack Obama
Ryan Phillippe (born 1974) – actor; born in New Castle
Aubrey Plaza (born 1984) – actress; comedian; April Ludgate on Parks and Recreation
David Plouffe (born 1967) – Senior Advisor to the President under U.S. President Barack Obama; born in Wilmington
Albert F. Polk (1869–1955) – lawyer; U.S. Representative from Delaware
Charles Polk Jr. (1788–1857) – General Assemblyman; Governor of Delaware
Teri Polo (born 1969) – actress; born in Dover
James Ponder (1819–1897) – General Assemblyman; Governor of Delaware
William Poole (born 1937) – member, Council of Economic Advisers; chief executive, Federal Reserve Bank of St. Louis
Bill Press (born 1940) – talk radio host; liberal commentator; author; raised in Delaware City
Ellen Bernard Thompson Pyle (1876–1936) – illustrator of covers for The Saturday Evening Post; student and sister-in-law of Howard Pyle
Howard Pyle (1853–1911) – illustrator; author; founder, Brandywine School, brother-in-law of Ellen Bernard Thompson Pyle
Katharine Pyle (1863–1938) – illustrator; author
Joe Pyne – broadcaster, worked in Delaware

R

John J. Raskob (1879–1950) – businessman; builder, Empire State Building
Harold R. "Tubby" Raymond (1926–2017) – University of Delaware football coach; College Football Hall of Famer
George Read (1733–1798) – U.S. Senator from Delaware; Chief Justice of Delaware
George Read Jr. (1765–1836) – U.S. Attorney, U.S. District Court for the District of Delaware; built the Read House and Gardens
Thomas Read (1740–1788) – first Commodore, Continental Navy
Louis L. Redding (1901–1998) – civil rights attorney; participant, Brown v. Board of Education case
Judge Reinhold (born 1957) – actor; born in Wilmington
Eugene Reybold (1884–1961) – Chief of Engineers, U.S. Army Corps of Engineers during World War II
Robert J. Reynolds (1838–1909) – General Assemblyman; Governor of Delaware
Harry A. Richardson (1853–1928) – businessman; U.S. Senator from Delaware
John E. Rickards (1848–1927) – 2nd Governor of Montana; born in Delaware City
George R. Riddle (1817–1867) – U.S. Representative; U.S. Senator from Delaware
Henry M. Ridgely (1779–1847) – U.S. Representative; U.S. Senator from Delaware
Robert P. Robinson (1869–1939) – banker; Governor of Delaware
Thomas Robinson Jr. (1800–1843) – lawyer; U.S. Representative from Delaware
Caesar Rodney (1728–1784) – Continental Congressman; President of Delaware
Caesar A. Rodney (1772–1824) – U.S. Senator from Delaware; U.S. Attorney General
Caleb Rodney (1767–1840) – General Assemblyman; Governor of Delaware
Daniel Rodney (1764–1846) – Governor of Delaware; U.S. Senator from Delaware
George B. Rodney (1803–1883) – lawyer; U.S. Representative from Delaware
Thomas Rodney (1744–1811) – General Assemblyman; Continental Congressman from Delaware
Daniel Rogers (1754–1806) – General Assemblyman; Governor of Delaware
John W. Rollins (1916–2000) – businessman; Lieutenant Governor of Delaware
David Roselle (born 1939) – mathematician; academic administrator
George Ross (1730–1779) – represented Pennsylvania in the Continental Congress
William H. H. Ross (1814–1887) – farmer; Governor of Delaware
Jane Richards Roth (born 1935) – judge, U.S. Court of Appeals
William V. Roth Jr. (1923–2003) – U.S. Representative; U.S. Senator from Delaware; namesake of Roth IRA and the Roth 401(k) retirement savings plans
Cynthia Rothrock (born 1957) – martial artist; actress; born in Wilmington

S

Sa–Sn

Eli M. Saulsbury (1817–1893) – General Assemblyman; U.S. Senator from Delaware
Gove Saulsbury (1815–1881) – General Assemblyman; Governor of Delaware
Willard Saulsbury Sr. (1820–1892) – Chancellor of Delaware; U.S. Senator from Delaware
Willard Saulsbury Jr. (1861–1927) – lawyer; U.S. Senator from Delaware
Frank Schoonover (1877–1972) – illustrator, Brandywine School
Marion duPont Scott (1894–1983) – preservationist; last private owner of Montpelier, the mansion and land estate of former U.S. President James Madison; born in Wilmington
Collins J. Seitz (1914–1998) – judge, U.S. Court of Appeals; presided over Gebhart v. Belton case
Virginia A. Seitz (born 1956) – U.S. Assistant Attorney General, Office of Legal Counsel
Frederic Kimber Seward (1878–1943) – corporate attorney; survivor, RMS Titanic
Mary Ann Shadd (1823–1893) – educator; newspaper publisher; abolitionist; suffragist; born in Wilmington
Dave Sheridan (born 1969) – actor, born in Newark
Chris Short – Major League Baseball player, born in Milford
Andrew Shue (born 1967) – actor; born in Wilmington
Elisabeth Shue (born 1963) – actress; born in Wilmington
John C. Sigler (born 1945) – former president, National Rifle Association
Helen Farr Sloan (1911–2005) – art philanthropist; former wife of John French Sloan
Melanie Sloan – executive director, Citizens for Responsibility and Ethics in Washington
Devin Smith – professional basketball player, Maccabi Tel Aviv
Nathaniel B. Smithers (1818–1896) – lawyer; U.S. Representative from Delaware
Thomas Alfred Smyth – last Union Army general killed in the American Civil War

Sn–Sz

Ian Snell (born 1981) – Major League Baseball player; born in Dover
Peter Spencer (1782–1843) – founder, A.U.M.P. Church
Presley Spruance (1785–1863) – General Assemblyman; U.S. Senator from Delaware
E. R. Squibb (1819–1900) – pharmaceutical inventor; founder, E. R. Squibb and Sons, a forerunner of Bristol-Myers Squibb
W. Laird Stabler Jr. (1930–2008) – lawyer; Attorney General of Delaware
Walter King Stapleton (born 1934) – judge, U.S. Court of Appeals
J. George Stewart (1890–1970) – architect; U.S. Representative from Delaware
Michael Stewart (born 1977) – professional boxer, lived in New Castle
Charles C. Stockley (1819–1901) – General Assemblyman; Governor of Delaware
Thomas Stockton (1781–1846) – soldier; Governor of Delaware
Jacob Stout (1764–1857) – General Assemblyman; Governor of Delaware
Susan Stroman (born 1954) – choreographer; director; born in Wilmington
George Sykes (1822–1880) – major general, American Civil War
James Sykes (1725–1792) – General Assemblyman; Continental Congressman
James Sykes (1761–1822) – General Assemblyman; Governor of Delaware

Timothy Szymanski (born 1964) – Vice Admiral, U.S. Navy SEAL

T

 William Temple (1814–1863) – Governor of Delaware; U.S. Representative from Delaware
 Charles L. Terry Jr. (1900–1970) – Chief Justice; Governor of Delaware
 William Tharp (1803–1865) – General Assemblyman; Governor of Delaware
 Charles Thomas (1790–1848) – General Assemblyman; Governor of Delaware
 Lorenzo Thomas (1804–1875) – adjutant general, U.S. Army; acting U.S. Secretary of War
 Sean Patrick Thomas (born 1970) – actor; born in Wilmington
 Jim Thompson (1906–1967) – businessman; born in Greenville
 George Thorogood (born 1950) – blues-rock musician; from Wilmington
 James Tilton (1745–1822) – 7th Surgeon General of the United States Army; delegate, Continental Congress; from Dover
 Alfred Thomas Archimedes Torbert (1833–1880) – general, Union Army; diplomat; born in Georgetown
 Reorus Torkillus (1608–1643) – first Swedish Lutheran minister to New Sweden
 Jeff Townes, also known as DJ Jazzy Jeff (born 1965) – hip hop, R&B disc jockey; record producer; turntablist; actor; has lived in Delaware since 2004
 John G. Townsend Jr. (1871–1964) – Governor of Delaware; U.S. Senator from Delaware
 Philip A. Traynor (1874–1962) – dentist, U.S. Representative from Delaware; born in Wilmington
 Sherman W. Tribbitt (1922–2010) – Lieutenant Governor of Delaware; Governor of Delaware
 George Truitt (1756–1818) – General Assemblyman; Governor of Delaware
 Ebe W. Tunnell (1844–1917) – General Assemblyman; Governor of Delaware
 James M. Tunnell (1879–1957) – lawyer; U.S. Senator from Delaware

V

 Nicholas Van Dyke (1738–1789) – Continental Congressman; President of Delaware
 Nicholas Van Dyke (1770–1826) – U.S. Representative; U.S. Senator from Delaware
 James C. Van Sice – rear admiral, U.S. Coast Guard; born in Wilmington
 Francis D. Vavala (born 1947) – major general, Army National Guard; adjutant general, Delaware National Guard
 Tom Verlaine – musician
 Mabel Vernon (1883–1975) – leader, women's suffrage movement (1910s); born in Wilmington
 John M. Vining (1758–1802) – U.S. Representative; U.S. Senator from Delaware

W

John Wales (1783–1863) – lawyer; U.S. Senator from Delaware
Herbert B. Warburton (1916–1983) – lawyer; U.S. Representative from Delaware
Herta Ware (1917–2005) – actress; political activist; born in Wilmington
William T. Watson (1849–1917) – General Assemblyman; Governor of Delaware
Dave Weigel – journalist, born in Wilmington
Johnny Weir (born 1984) – figure skater; three-time U.S. national champion; lived in Newark
William H. Wells (1769–1829) – General Assemblyman; U.S. Senator from Delaware
Joey Wendle (born 1990) – second baseman for the Tampa Bay Rays
George Alexis Weymouth (1936–2016) – painter; land conservationist; founder, Brandywine River Museum; born in Wilmington
Samuel Wharton (1732–1800) – merchant; Continental Congressman
John P. Wheeler III (1944–2010) – government official; chair, Vietnam Veterans Memorial Fund
William G. Whiteley (1819–1886) – Mayor of Wilmington; U.S. Representative from Delaware
Randy White – Pro Football Hall of Famer; attended high school in Delaware
Samuel White (1770–1809) – lawyer; U.S. Senator from Delaware
Kathleen Widdoes (born 1939) – actress; born in Wilmington
Earle D. Willey (1889–1950) – lawyer; U.S. Representative from Delaware
George S. Williams (1877–1961) – businessman; U.S. Representative from Delaware
James Williams (1825–1899) – General Assemblyman; U. S. Representative from Delaware
John J. Williams (1904–1988) – businessman; U.S. Senator from Delaware
Jonathan S. Willis (1830–1903) – minister; U.S. Representative from Delaware
James H. Wilson (1837–1925) – major general, American Civil War (captured Jefferson Davis and Henry Wirz)
Josiah O. Wolcott (1877–1938) – U.S. Senator from Delaware; Chancellor of Delaware
Dale E. Wolf (1924–2021) – Lieutenant Governor of Delaware; Governor of Delaware
Shien Biau Woo (born 1937) – professor; Lieutenant Governor of Delaware
Daniel Woodall (1841–1880) – brigadier general, American Civil War
Victor Baynard Woolley (1867–1945) – judge, U.S. Court of Appeals
Paul Worrilow (born 1990) – professional football player; born in Wilmington
Thomas Wynne (1627–1691) – physician; justice, Sussex County (1687–1691)

Y

 Cori Yarckin (born 1982) – actress; singer; born in Seaford

Z

 Aleksandra Ziolkowska-Boehm (born 1949) – writer; of Polish origin; lives in Wilmington

See also

 List of Delaware state senators
 List of governors of Delaware
 List of justices of the Delaware Supreme Court
 List of lieutenant governors of Delaware
 List of Delaware suffragists
 List of mayors of Wilmington, Delaware
 List of people from Wilmington, Delaware
 List of United States congressional delegations from Delaware
 List of United States representatives from Delaware
 List of United States senators from Delaware
 List of University of Delaware people

References